Thomas Hastings may refer to:
Thomas Hastings (colonist) (1605–1685), English immigrant to New England
Thomas Hastings (composer) (1784–1872), American composer, primarily of hymn tunes
Thomas Hastings (cricketer) (1865–1938), Australian cricketer
Thomas Hastings (Royal Navy officer) (1790–1870), British artist, innovator, instructor, and Royal Navy officer
Thomas Horace Hastings, namesake of Hastings, Florida
Thomas Hastings (architect) (1860–1929), American architect
Thomas N. Hastings (1858–1907), American politician and architect
Thomas Hastings (priest) (1733–1794), clergyman in the Church of Ireland
Thomas Hastings (MP), Member of Parliament for Leicestershire

See also
Thomas Hoo, Baron Hoo and Hastings (died 1455), Knight of the Garter and English courtier
Hastings (name)